The 1950 Grand National was the 104th renewal of the Grand National horse race that took place at Aintree Racecourse near Liverpool, England, on 25 March 1950.

Nearly 500,000 people packed into Aintree for the first royal National since the Second World War. In attendance were King George VI, Queen Elizabeth, their daughter Princess Elizabeth, and a number of other members of the royal family. Royal interest centred on Monaveen, the co-third-favourite who was jointly owned by the Queen and Princess Elizabeth. Despite leading the field, Monaveen made a bad mistake at The Chair, nearly unseating his jockey, and losing significant ground.

The race was won by Freebooter, the 10/1 joint-favourite ridden by Irish jockey Jimmy Power and trained by Bobby Renton for owner Lurline Brotherton. In second place was Wot No Sun, Acthon Major finished third, and Rowland Roy fourth.

Forty-nine horses ran and all returned safely to the stables.

Finishing order

Non-finishers

References

 1950
Grand National
Grand National
Grand National
20th century in Lancashire